Past Perfect is a 2003 Italian comedy film directed by Maria Sole Tognazzi. It was entered into the 25th Moscow International Film Festival.

Synopsis
It is a film in regard to some Italian friends who are having romantic feelings for each other. There are many love triangles involved.

Cast
 Valentina Cervi as Carola Baiardo
 Paola Cortellesi as Claudia
 Claudio Gioè as Giammaria
 Ignazio Oliva as Edoardo Stella
 Claudio Santamaria as Andrea
 Alessia Barela as Monica
 Francesca Figus as Francesca
 Francine Berting as Elisa - Edoardo's Fiancée (as Francina Berting)
 Francesca Borelli as Carola's Friend (as Francesca Haydèe Borelli)
 Giorgio Colangeli as Traffic Policeman
 Stefano Venturi as Vittorio Badaloni - the Assistant Director
 Pierfrancesco Favino as Filippo
 Gianmarco Tognazzi as Alberto

References

External links
 

2003 films
2003 comedy films
Italian comedy films
2000s Italian-language films
Films directed by Maria Sole Tognazzi